Ali Sidqi Azaykou (1942–2004), also called Dda Ali, was a Moroccan Berber poet, historian, philosopher and critic.
He was an Amazigh activist. He has greatly influenced the cultural Berber movements.

Biography 
Ali Sidqi Azaykou was born (1942) in the village of Igran n tuinght in the High Atlas in the surroundings of Taroudannt in the Sous region in Morocco. He began his primary education in his native village and ended them in Marrakesh where he also followed his secondary education and entered the national teacher training college.

Books

 . Collection of Berber poetry. 1988.
 . Éd. de la Faculté des Lettres, Kénitra, 1992.
 . Collection of Berber poetry. Rabat, 1995.
 . Recueil d'articles. Éd. Centre Tarik Ibn Zyad, Rabat, 2002. Introduction by Ahmed Toufiq.
 , 2002.
 , 2004.
 , Éd. Annajah Al Jadida, 1993, Casablanca.

Notes

1942 births
2004 deaths
Berber writers
Berber Moroccans
Berber poets
Berber historians
20th-century Moroccan historians
Moroccan lexicographers
Moroccan literary critics
20th-century Moroccan poets
People from Taroudannt
People from Marrakesh
21st-century Moroccan poets
Shilha people
20th-century lexicographers